Year 150 (CL) was a common year starting on Wednesday (link will display the full calendar) of the Julian calendar. In the Roman Empire, it was known as the Year of the Consulship of Squilla and Vetus (or, less frequently, year 903 Ab urbe condita). The denomination 150 for this year has been used since the early medieval period, when the Anno Domini calendar era became the prevalent method in Europe for naming years.

Events

By place

Roman Empire 

 The Roman town Forum Hadriani (Voorburg) receives the title of Municipium Aelium Cananefatium, "the town of the Cananefates" (modern Netherlands). The town is awarded with rights to organize markets. 
 The Germans of the east move south, into the Carpathians and Black Sea area.
 The Albani appear in the Roman province of Macedonia, specifically in Epirus.

Asia 

 First and only year of Heping of the Chinese Han Dynasty.

Americas 

 The Middle Culture period of Mayan civilization ends (approximate date).
 The Great Pyramid of the Sun is constructed in Teotihuacan.  It is the tallest pre-Columbian building in the Americas.

By topic

Religion 
 Marcion of Sinope produces his Bible canon, consisting of purged versions of the Gospel of Luke and ten Pauline letters (approximate date).

Art and science 
 The earliest atlas (Ptolemy's Geography) is made (approximate date).
 This is also the approximate date of completion of Ptolemy's monumental work Almagest. The geocentric cosmology contained in it holds sway for 1,400 years.
 Antoninus Liberalis writes a work on mythology (Μεταμορφωσεων Συναγωγη) (approximate date).
 Paper, made in China, arrives in Transoxiana.

Births 
 March 7 – Lucilla, Roman empress (d. 182)
 Clement of Alexandria, Greek theologian (d. 215)
 Gongsun Du, Chinese general and warlord (d. 204)
 Lucius Fabius Cilo, Roman politician (approximate date)
 Monoimus, Arab gnostic and writer (approximate date)
 Nagarjuna, founder of Mahayana "Great Vehicle" (d. c. 250)
 Xu Shao, Chinese official of the Han Dynasty (d. 195)
 Yufuluo, Chanyu of the southern Xiongnu (d. 196)
 Zhang Zhongjing, Chinese physician (d. 219)

Deaths 
 Aspasius, Greek philosopher and writer (approximate date)
 Aśvaghoṣa, Indian philosopher and poet (approximate date)
 Liang Na, Chinese empress of the Han Dynasty (b. 116)

References 

 

als:150er#150